Gavāṃpati is a disciple of the Buddha, one of the first ten to be ordained and to have known the state of Arhat. In Southeastern Buddhism, Gavāṃpati has become a preeminent character. In Thailand amulet as Pidta, Laos, Cambodia, and the Shan states, the Mon cult of Gavampati has survived.

Notes

References

Disciples of Gautama Buddha
Arhats